"Cuba Libre" is a song recorded by Swedish rapper Moncho. The song was released as a digital download on 26 February 2018 and peaked at number 31 on the Swedish Singles Chart. It is taking part in Melodifestivalen 2018, and qualified to andra chansen from the third semi-final on 17 February 2018. It was written by Moncho along with Jimmy Jansson, David Strääf, Markus Videsäter, and Axel Schylström.

Track listing

Charts

Release history

References

2018 singles
2017 songs
Swedish-language songs
Melodifestivalen songs of 2018
Universal Music Group singles
Songs written by Jimmy Jansson
Moncho songs
Songs written by Axel Schylström